Ballers is an American sports comedy drama television series created by Stephen Levinson and starring Dwayne Johnson as Spencer Strasmore, a retired NFL player who must navigate his new career of choice as the financial manager of other NFL players. The series premiered on the American cable television network HBO on June 21, 2015, with a pilot episode written by Stephen Levinson and directed by Peter Berg. The fifth and final season premiered on August 25, 2019, and concluded on October 13, 2019.

Cast and characters

Main
 Dwayne Johnson as Spencer Strasmore, a retired NFL player turned financial manager. He eventually becomes owner and general manager of the Kansas City Chiefs
 Rob Corddry as Joe Krutel, a financial advisor at Anderson Financial who eventually opens his own sports entertainment firm
 John David Washington as Ricky Jerret, a highly competitive and spiritual NFL player
 Omar Miller as Charles Greane, an affable former NFL player who is searching for his next career. He later becomes President and general manager of the Los Angeles Rams after a stint with the Miami Dolphins
 Donovan W. Carter as Vernon Littlefield, a deeply family-oriented defensive end of the Dallas Cowboys
 Troy Garity as Jason Antolotti, a top-tier sports agent
 London Brown as Reggie, Vernon's childhood friend who handles his money
 Jazmyn Simon as Julie Greane, wife of ex–NFL player Charles Greane
 Arielle Kebbel as Tracy Legette (season 2; recurring, season 1 and 5), a sportscaster for a local TV station who is intimately involved with Spencer
 Brittany S. Hall as Amber, Ricky Jerret's past fling who later becomes his live in girlfriend and child's mother. (season 4–5; recurring season 3)

Recurring 
 Carl McDowell as TTD, Ricky's friend, confidant and assistant.
 Dulé Hill as Larry Siefert, the GM for the Miami Dolphins
 Christopher McDonald as "Boss Man," an owner of the Dallas Cowboys
 Anabelle Acosta as Annabella Ruiz, girlfriend of Ricky Jerret
 Taylor Cole as Stephanie Michaels, an ESPN sideline reporter who is romantically involved with Spencer
 LeToya Luckett as Tina, widow to one of Spencer's closest friends
 Ella Thomas as Kara Cooley, Alonzo Cooley's mother, and an interior decorator to the pro athletes who is also involved with Ricky
 Emayatzy Corinealdi as Candace Brewer, high-powered sports executive who goes toe to toe with Spencer.
 Antoine Harris as Alonzo Cooley, Ricky's passive-aggressive teammate
 Taylour Paige as Theresa, Julie's sister
 Sanai L. Johnson as Bey, daughter of Theresa
 Richard Schiff as Brett Anderson, a.k.a. "The Old Man", owner of Anderson Financial Management
 Clifton Collins, Jr. as Maximo Gomez, Angela Lee's lawyer
 Angelina Assereto as Angela Lee, Maximo's client who was briefly involved with Spencer
 Robert Wisdom as Dennis Jerret, Ricky's estranged father who was a tight end on the '85 Bears
 Michael Cudlitz as Dan Balsamo, owner of Dan's Auto Collision and former Buffalo Bills running back who got hurt from Spencer's hard hit
 Christine Allocca as Kerri Balsamo, Dan's wife
 Carmelo "Q" Oquendo as NFL Prospect
 Stephanie Sandri as herself, Jarrod Sandri's wife
Robert Crayton as Nick Kovack player cut from the team
 Terrell Suggs as himself
 Jay Glazer as a fictional version of himself
 Serinda Swan as Chloe Day, a smart hotel management executive
 Andy García as money management titan Andre Allen, who has bad blood with Spencer
 Steve Guttenberg as Wayne Hastings Jr.
 Lisa Arturo as Nancy
 Peter Berg as a fictional version of himself; Head Coach of the Miami Dolphins (seasons 1–3)
 Kristopher Lofton as Kisan Teague, a talented NFL Running Back whose off-field antics and entourage keep getting him in trouble (seasons 3–5)
Russell Brand as Lance Klians, CEO of SportsX (season 4–5)
 Catherine Haena Kim as Kate, Creative Director of SportsX & Joe's love interest (season 5)
 Amanda Rea as Donna, love interest of Jason Antolotti, whom he ends up proposing to. (Season 3-5)

Episodes

Season 1 (2015)

Season 2 (2016)

Season 3 (2017)

Season 4 (2018)

Season 5 (2019)

Ratings

Broadcast
The series premiered in the U.S. on HBO on June 21, 2015, in Canada on June 21, 2015 on HBO Canada, in India on June 22, 2015 on HBO Defined, in the United Kingdom on September 8, 2015 on Sky Atlantic, and in Australia on September 15, 2015 on Showcase.

The second season premiered on July 17, 2016 and a third on July 23, 2017. On August 8, 2017, HBO picked up Ballers for a fourth season, which premiered on August 12, 2018. On September 6, 2018, HBO renewed the series for a fifth season.

Reception
On Rotten Tomatoes, the first season has an approval rating of 81% based on 47 reviews, with an average rating of 6.43/10. The site's critical consensus reads, "Ballers may not be a game-changer, but it scores points with Dwayne 'The Rock' Johnson, who brings charm and depth to the NFL version of Entourage." On Metacritic, the season has a score of 65 out of 100, based on 35 critics, indicating "generally favorable reviews".

On Rotten Tomatoes season 2 has a rating of 70% based on 10 reviews, with an average rating of 6.65/10. On Metacritic, the season has a score of 63 out of 100, based on 4 critics, indicating "generally favorable reviews".

On Rotten Tomatoes, the third season has a rating of 60%, based on 5 reviews, with an average rating of 5/10.

Home media 
The series has been released on Blu-ray and DVD; season 1 on June 14, 2016, Season 2 on January 31, 2017, Season 3 on April 3, 2018, and Season 4 on January 29, 2019. Season 5's DVD and manufacture on demand Blu-ray was released on January 28, 2020 by Warner Home Entertainment and Warner Archive Collection respectively. In addition, the complete series box set was  released on DVD the same day.

References

External links
 
 
 

2010s American comedy-drama television series
2015 American television series debuts
2019 American television series endings
English-language television shows
HBO original programming
Serial drama television series
Television shows filmed in Miami
Television shows set in Miami
American sports television series
National Football League television series
Miami Dolphins